George W. Brown (October 24, 1885September 16, 1955) was a Negro leagues outfielder for several years before the founding of the first Negro National League, and in its first two seasons.

References

External links
 and Baseball-Reference Black Baseball stats and Seamheads

1885 births
1955 deaths
Negro league baseball managers
Indianapolis ABCs players
St. Louis Giants players
Dayton Marcos players
Cleveland Tate Stars players
Detroit Stars players
Sportspeople from Aurora, Illinois
Baseball players from Illinois
Baseball outfielders
20th-century African-American people